112 may refer to:

112 (number), the natural number following 111 and preceding 113
112 (band), an American R&B quartet from Atlanta, Georgia
112 (album), album from the band of the same name
112 (emergency telephone number), the standard emergency phone number in the European Union and on GSM cellphones
112 BC, a year
AD 112, a year of the Julian calendar
Copernicium, an element with atomic number 112
112 (MBTA bus)
112 (New Jersey bus)
KFM 112M aircraft engine
Thai Criminal Code section 112, see Lèse majesté in Thailand

See also
 1/12 (disambiguation)
 11/2 (disambiguation)
 I12 (disambiguation)
Copernicium, synthetic chemical element with atomic number 112